Z11 may refer to:
 Changhe Z-11, a light utility helicopter
 German destroyer Z11 Bernd von Arnim, a Type 1934A destroyer built for the German Navy in the late 1930s
 GN-z11, a high-redshift galaxy that used to be the furthest known
 Small nucleolar RNA snR61/Z1/Z11, a non-coding RNA molecule
 Z11 (computer), the first serially-produced computer of the Zuse KG